Mick Durham is an American college basketball coach, currently men's head coach for Montana State University Billings. He had previously been head coach at the University of Alaska Fairbanks, where he led the program for 7 seasons.

Durham was born in Chicago, but grew up in Three Forks, Montana where he led Three Forks High School to the 1974 Montana Class B State championship. He accepted a scholarship offer to nearby Montana State, where he became a three-year starter at point guard , leaving as one of the school's all-time leaders in assists and free throw percentage. Following the close of his playing career, Durham coached high school basketball at Shepherd High School in Shepherd, Montana from 1980 to 1982 before returning to Montana State as an assistant coach.

Following eight seasons as an assistant to Stu Starner, Durham moved to the head coaching position in 1990 when Starner left the post for a leave of absence. In 16 seasons leading the Bobcats, Durham compiled a record of 246–213. His teams won Big Sky Conference regular season championships in 1996 and 2002, and won the Big Sky tournament in 1996. Durham was named the conference coach of the year on three occasions (1996, 2002 and 2005). Durham resigned on March 13, 2006 following a 15–15 season.

Durham returned to coaching in 2008 as an assistant at New Mexico State University. After three seasons, he was chosen head coach at Alaska in 2011.

In March 2018, Durham accepted the head men's coaching job at Montana State University Billings.

References

External links
Alaska Nanooks coaching bio
College playing stats

1957 births
Living people
Alaska Nanooks men's basketball coaches
American men's basketball players
Basketball coaches from Illinois
Basketball coaches from Montana
Basketball players from Chicago
Basketball players from Montana
College men's basketball head coaches in the United States
High school basketball coaches in Montana
Montana State Billings Yellowjackets men's basketball coaches
Montana State Bobcats men's basketball coaches
Montana State Bobcats men's basketball players
New Mexico State Aggies men's basketball coaches
People from Gallatin County, Montana
Point guards